In project management, a project charter, project definition, or project statement is a statement of the scope, objectives, and participants in a project. It provides a preliminary delineation of roles and responsibilities, outlines the project's key goals, identifies the main stakeholders, and defines the authority of the project manager.

In Initiative for Policy Dialogue (IPD), this document is known as the project charter. In customer relationship management (CRM), it is known as the project definition report.  Both IPD and CRM require this document as part of the project management process.

Purpose 
The project charter is usually a short document that explains a project clearly and concisely, and refers to more detailed documents for additional information. A project charter should:
 Identify the scope of the project.
 Provide a shared understanding of the project objectives.
 Act as a contract between the project sponsor, key stakeholders and the project team, detailing responsibilities.
 
A project charter typically documents most of the following:
 Reasons for undertaking the project
 Objectives and constraints of the project, including in-scope and out-of-scope items
 Identities of the main stakeholders
 Risks and issues (a risk management plan should be part of the overall project management plan)
 Benefits of the project
 High level budget and spending authority

Establishing authority 
The project charter establishes the authority assigned to the project manager, especially in a matrix management environment.  It is considered industry best practice.

Uses 
The three main uses of the project charter are:
 To authorize the project - using a comparable format, projects can be ranked and authorized by Return on Investment.
 Serves as the primary sales document for the project - ranking stakeholders have a 1-2 page summary to distribute, present, and keep handy for fending off other project or operations runs at project resources.
 Serves as a focal point throughout the project. For example, it is a baseline that can be used in team meetings and in change control meetings to assist with scope management.

Development 
A project charter will be created in the initiating process group of a phase or a project at the very start. Developing the charter and identifying the stakeholders are the two main actions of the initiating process group.
Typically a project manager takes the lead in developing the charter. The project manager will employ his or her expertise and experience to develop the charter. The project manager will work with the key stakeholders (customers and business sponsors), the PMO, Subject Matter Experts inside and outside the organization, other units within the organization and may also work with Industry groups or professional bodies to develop the charter. The project manager will employ facilitation techniques such as brainstorming, problem solving, conflict resolution, meetings, expectations management etc. to develop the charter.

Inputs to develop a charter can be:
 Project Statement of Work
 Business Case
 Agreements
Assumptions
 Enterprise standards, industry standards, regulations and norms
 Organizational process, assets and templates
The charter once signed will provide authority to the project manager to officially execute the project and employ organizational funds and resources to make the project successful.

For a large multi-phased project, the charter can be created for each individual phase. For example, there can be an initial charter during the Scope and Seek phase of a project, followed by a Planning charter and an Execution Charter during the build phase of the project.

See also
 Project scope

References

External links
 Project Charter Template-WIKIVERSITY

Project management